Baliganur is a village in the Krishnagiri taluk of Krishnagiri District, Tamil Nadu, India. Baliganur is 20 km far from the district headquarters Krishnagiri . It is 231 km far from the state capital Chennai.

Baliganur is a name derived from balika which means young girl. The village is referred to as Gangakulam (Tamil: கங்காகுலம்).

In the modern age people can recognise as the Black Hill Village (Karimalai), after a hill located right in front of the village. It is surrounded by minor forest on one quarter.

Agriculture in Baliganur

The important crops of Baliganur Village are rice, ragi, banana, tomato, coconut, mango, groundnut, vegetables and flowers. The village has an excellent scope for agri business.

Population

Jallikattu Festival 
The bull-baiting sport known as Jallikattu is practiced in Baliganur during the annual Thai Pongal festival, using highly trained bulls and malai madus.

Geography
The nearest towns are:
 Rayakottai (7.1 km)
 Veppanapalli (20.6 km)
 Shoolagiri (25.5 km) and
 Hosur (40.5 km)

The nearest villages are Bellampalli, Ennekol Pudur, Chikkapoovathi, Alappatti, and Madepatti.

Education

Nearby schools
 Nalanda Matriculation Higher Secondary School
 R C Fathima Boys High School
 SVC Matriculation School
 Municipal Higher Secondary School
 Government Boys Higher Secondary School

Nearby colleges
 Government Arts College
 Government Arts and Science College for Women
 A.E.S. Teacher Training Education Institute
 Arignar Anna College

Nearby banks
 Tamilnad Mercantile Bank, Ltd., Krishnagiri
 Union Bank of India, Krishnagiri
 Indian Bank, Royakottah
 State Bank of India, Krishnagiri town

References

Villages in Krishnagiri district